Laminosioptidae is a family of mites belonging to the order Sarcoptiformes.

Genera:
 Aratingocoptes Fain & Perez, 1990
 Colicoptes Lombert & Lukoschus, 1981
 Fainocoptes Lukoschus & Lombert, 1979
 Laminosioptes Mégnin, 1880
 Rallicoptes Lukoschus & Lombert, 1980

References 

Sarcoptiformes
Acari families